John Henry Keating (28 June 1872 – 31 October 1940) was an Australian  politician who served as a Senator for Tasmania from 1901 to 1923. He held ministerial office in Alfred Deakin's second government, serving as Vice-President of the Executive Council (1906–1907) and Minister for Home Affairs (1907–1908).

Early life
Keating was born in Hobart and educated at Officer College, Hobart, Saint Ignatius' College, Riverview, Sydney and the University of Tasmania where he received a Bachelor of Laws in 1896. He established a legal practice in Launceston and became a campaigner for federation and secretary of the Northern Tasmanian Federation League. He married Sarah Alice "Lallie" Monks in January 1906.

Political career

Keating stood unsuccessfully for the Tasmanian House of Assembly seat of George Town in 1900. In the 1901 election, he was elected to the Australian Senate as the youngest member of the Parliament, where he supported the Protectionist Party governments of Edmund Barton and Alfred Deakin. He supported the establishment of a system of compulsory conciliation and arbitration a Commonwealth old-age pension scheme and a White Australia. He was appointed an honorary minister in the second Deakin Ministry in July 1905 and Vice-President of the Executive Council in October 1906. He was responsible for the drafting of the 1905 Copyright Act.

Keating was Minister for Home Affairs from January 1907 to November 1908 and was responsible for passing a bill to provide bounties to assist industry and a bill to establish the Commonwealth quarantine service. He sat on the backbench during Deakin's Fusion government. Although he fully supported Australia's participation in World War I, he voted to force the Hughes government to an election in 1917 in protest at Hughes' manoeuvering to have the Tasmanian Government replace Labor Senator Rudolph Ready—who had been forced by ill-health to resign—with the Nationalist John Earle, thus gaining control of the Senate.

Later life
Keating failed to win re-election as a Nationalist at the 1922 election and returned to his legal practice. His wife died in October 1939 and he died a year later of the effects of a duodenal ulcer, survived by a son and a daughter. He was the last surviving member of Alfred Deakin's 1906-1907 Cabinet.

Notes

Protectionist Party members of the Parliament of Australia
Commonwealth Liberal Party members of the Parliament of Australia
Nationalist Party of Australia members of the Parliament of Australia
Members of the Australian Senate for Tasmania
Members of the Australian Senate
Members of the Cabinet of Australia
1872 births
1940 deaths
20th-century Australian politicians